Northwood School is an independent co-educational boarding and day school for grades 9 through 12 located in Lake Placid, New York in the heart of the Adirondack Mountains.

History

1905–1927: Founding and early years 
In 1905 John M. Hopkins, a Yale graduate who had previously taught at The Hill School and the Florida-Adirondack School (later Ransom Everglades School), established a school in Lake Placid described as, “organized with quarters in the Adirondacks in the summer and in Florida in the winter. The school will furnish a home in which boys may have careful personal attention, the advantages of experienced teachers and wholesome natural outdoor life and amusements.” During this time the school was known variously as Hopkins School, Lake Placid School, and Lake Placid Boys School. Hopkins led the school until 1921 and oversaw its growth from six students to forty. By the time of Hopkins's departure the school was described as being, “...remarkably successful not only in the records of its boys in entrance examinations, but in their after careers in college.”

Herbert L. Malcolm, another Yale graduate, took over leadership of the school in 1921 and served as headmaster until 1925. The school had for years enjoyed a close relationship with the Lake Placid Club, which had been founded by Melvil Dewey, creator of the Dewey Decimal System, in 1895. Many of the students’ families were members of the club and the school utilized club grounds and buildings. In 1925, the Lake Placid Club Education Foundation took over formal control of the school.

This transition brought the arrival of Robert W. Boyden as the school's new headmaster and also marked the end of the school's annual winter migration to Florida in order to, "secure continuity of educational effort and also to enrich the school life by the varied winter sports available for physical development."

1927–1944: Becoming Northwood 
In 1927, Dr. Ira A. Flinner, who received his doctorate from Harvard, was appointed headmaster, a position he would hold until 1951. Early in his tenure the school moved to its present location and adopted a new name, Northwood School. Under Flinner, Northwood continued to expand its physical plant and increase enrollment.

In 1934 Northwood School received its charter by the Regents of the State of New York, and was made a not for profit institution governed by a Board of Trustees.

1944–45: Hiatus 
In the summer of 1944, the U.S. Army took over control of Northwood's buildings for use as a medical unit within the redeployment center in Lake Placid, NY. The school was closed until the U.S. Army relinquished control of the buildings. In the fall of 1946, Northwood reopened.

1946–1965: Re-opening and changes 
Moreau C. Hunt became headmaster in 1951. John G. Howard took over for him in 1954. Howard brought updates to the school buildings and new courses in public speaking and debate. Under Howard, the school newspaper, The Mirror, was elevated in stature and became a more formal and regularly released publication.

1965–1997: Continued growth, coeducation 
In 1965, Edward C. Welles became headmaster. He was soon followed by W. John Friedlander in 1967, who served as the school's headmaster until 1996. Friedlander oversaw the school's continued expansion and its transition into a coeducational institution. Female students were first formally enrolled as day students in 1971, and then as boarding students in 1972.

1997–present 
Edward M. Good took over as Northwood's headmaster in 1997. In 2015, Michael J. Maher, former head of Berkshire School, succeeded Good as Northwood's Head of School.

Notable alumni

Sam Faber, professional ice hockey player
Konstanze Krüger, German zoologist
Mike Richter, professional ice hockey player
Martin Hyun, writer and professional ice hockey player 
Andrew Weibrecht, world cup and Olympic ski racer
Edward Platt, actor best known for playing ”The Chief” in the television show, Get Smart
Andrea Kilbourne-Hill, Olympic ice hockey player
Theodore Davidge Lockwood, former president of Trinity College
Blake Bolden, professional ice hockey player
Tony Granato, professional ice hockey player
Kelley Steadman, professional ice hockey player
Tom Mellor, professional ice hockey player
Craig Conroy, professional ice hockey player
Steven Zalewski, professional ice hockey player

Notes

References
 Ackerman, David H. Lake Placid Club: An illustrated history: 1895-1980. Lake Placid Education Foundation, 1998.  .

External links
 Northwood School website
 Boarding School Review
 TABS Association of Boarding Schools Northwood Profile

1905 establishments in New York (state)
Boarding schools in New York (state)
Educational institutions established in 1905
Private high schools in New York (state)
Schools in Essex County, New York